The Thirteenth Seimas of Lithuania is a parliament (Seimas) in Lithuania. Elections took place on 11 October 2020, with the run-off on 25 October. The Seimas commenced its work on 13 November 2020 and is serving a four-year term.

Elections

In the elections in 2020, 70 members of the parliament were elected on proportional party lists and 71 in single member constituencies. Elections took place on 11 October 2020. Run-off elections were held on 25 October in the single-seat constituencies where no candidate secured a seat in the first round.

Activities

Viktorija Čmilytė-Nielsen was elected as the Speaker of the Thirteenth Seimas.

The Thirteenth Seimas was marked by the COVID-19 pandemic. It affected the parliament's work (e.g. from 26 November 2020 until 3 December 2020, plenary sessions were suspended and since 12 January 2021, plenary sessions are taking place remotely).

Composition

Parliamentary groups

After the elections, the parliamentary groups were formed in the Seimas, largely on the party lines: Political Group of Democrats ‘For Lithuania’(DFVL), Freedom Party (LF), Homeland Union - Lithuanian Christian Democrats (TSLKDF), Labour Party (DPF), Liberal Movement (LSF), Lithuanian Farmers and Greens Union (LVŽSF), Lithuanian Regions Political Group (LRF), Mixed Group (MSNG) and Social Democratic Party of Lithuania (LSDPF).

Members

145 members have served in the Thirteenth Seimas.

References 

13
2020 in Lithuania
Seimas of Lithuania